Andy Pratt may refer to:

 Andy Pratt (baseball) (born 1979), former Major League Baseball pitcher
 Andy Pratt (singer-songwriter) (born 1947), American singer-songwriter and musician
 Andy Pratt (album)

See also
 Andrew Pratt (born 1975), English cricketer
 Pratt (surname)

Pratt, Andy